Anwar Jalalpuri (6 July 1947 – 2 January 2018) was an Indian Urdu poet from Jalalpur, Uttar Pradesh, known for translating the Bhagavad Gita from Sanskrit to Urdu.

He received the Padma Shri posthumously from the President of India, and the Yash Bharti Award from the government of Uttar Pradesh. He also got Maati Ratan Samman by Shaheed Shodha Sansthan.

He died from a brain stroke on 2 January 2018.

References

Urdu-language poets from India
Recipients of the Padma Shri in literature & education
1947 births
2018 deaths
People from Ambedkar Nagar district
People from Faizabad district